Westfield Whitford City, formerly Whitford City Shopping Centre, is a major shopping centre located in Hillarys, east of St. Mark's Anglican Community School in Perth, Western Australia.

In 2006 the shopping centre had a turnover of $395.4 million and approximately 7.2 million customer visits. The trade-area population surrounding the shopping location is about 224,410 and the total retail spending in that area is $2.3 billion.

History
Whitford City opened on 21 March 1978 and had an Aherns department store until 1985, one of Western Australia's first BigW discount department stores, a Woolworths supermarket, and 50 specialty stores. The centre also had outdoor facilities and a library, and a petrol station was built near the centre  shortly after the opening. 

Whitford City is currently Perth's largest shopping centre without a flagship department store such as Myer or David Jones. The shopping centre has officially been part of the Westfield Group since 2004 and is currently home to over 240 speciality stores. In July 2014, the Westfield Group became two companies (Scentre Group and Westfield Corporation), with ownership and management transferring to Scentre Group.

1989–1990
This new redevelopment was set to include a relocated Woolworths supermarket, and a new Food Court featuring a McDonald's. The addition of the new food court however, would cause the Aherns department store to be demolished. Since then, Westfield Whitford City has not had a department store such as Myer or David Jones. The redevelopment was completed by 1990.

1991–1993
The new redevelopment included a new Target discount department store, expanded the west side of the mall featuring over 40 specialty stores, and the existing mall was renovated including Big W. In 1993, two new fast food restaurants, a Hungry Jack's and a KFC, were built outside the centre, completing the redevelopment.

1992–1996
In 1992, construction of a 6-screen cinema complex was approved. The redevelopment was completed in 1996 which included a Greater Union Cinemas, an Intencity arcade and a Lone Star Steakhouse & Saloon. The Greater Union occupied the second floor beside the Food Court.

2001–2004
The $80 million redevelopment included the following.

A new mall to the upper-west side of the centre.
A relocated Woolworths supermarket.
A new Fresh Food Market.
A new Rebel and Best & Less mini-major store.
Expanded parking, and fast food restaurants.
Renovations to the entire existing mall.
A new outdoor dining area named the "Piazza" with featured a view onto Whitfords Avenue.

Upon completion of the redevelopment, Greater Union sold their cinema in the centre to Grand Cinemas in 2004, and Whitford City was sold to Westfield which rebranded the centre to Westfield Whitford City and overhauled signage and entrances.

2016–2017
On 8 July 2016 Scentre Group announced a $80 million redevelopment that focused on the outdoor Piazza and included the following.

A complete demolishing of the existing Piazza and cinema complex.
A new 8-screen Event Cinemas complex featuring two "V-Max" and "Gold Class" screens.
12 new dining restaurants including the first micro-brewery in Western Australia, The Whitfords Brewing Company.
A new iPlay located in the basement floor featuring an arcade and bowling alley.
A relocated Rebel near the Food Court.
An overhauled Fresh Food Market with a renovated Woolworths supermarket.

2019–2021
On 13 January 2021, it was announced that Target would close its Whitford City store by mid-2021 after over 30 years, to be converted into Kmart. Shortly after that it was confirmed that a 24 hour Goodlife Health Clubs would open in the centre in November 2021, presumably in the former Lincraft.

A new Aldi supermarket opened on 7 October 2020 between the Fresh Food Market and Target.

Transport
The centre is bounded by the major roads of Marmion Avenue and Whitfords Avenue in Hillarys. Bus routes 460, 461 and 462 also service the centre from the Whitfords railway station and Joondalup railway station.

Gallery

References

External links

Westfield Group
Shopping centres in Perth, Western Australia
Shopping malls established in 1978